Atalla may refer to:

Mohamed M. Atalla, Egyptian-American semiconductor and cybersecurity pioneer, also known by the alias "John" or "Martin" M. Atalla
Utimaco Atalla, Information Protection and Control Suite (data security software) company, founded by Mohamed Atalla
Ash Atalla, a British television producer
Andrew Atalla, the British founder of online marketing agency atom42
The former name of Epworth, Georgia

See also
Attala (disambiguation)